Carradale Point Fort is a promontory vitrified fort on Carradale Point near Carradale, Argyll and Bute, Scotland. The fort measures  by  internally.

Notes

Buildings and structures in Argyll and Bute